The 1996 Tour de Langkawi was the first edition of the Tour de Langkawi, a cycling stage race that took place in Malaysia. It  officially began on 29 February in Langkawi and ended on 10 March in Langkawi. The race was sanctioned by the Union Cycliste Internationale (UCI) as a 2.5 category race.

Australian rider, Damian McDonald emerged as the first winner of the race. Chris Newton of Great Britain was second and another Australian, Brett Dennis third. McDonald was also the first winner of points classification and mountains classification of the race. Giant-AIS won the team classification of the race.

Stages
The race comprised 11 stages, covering 1,294.8 kilometres.

Final standings

General classification

References

Tour de Langkawi
Tour de Langkawi
Tour de Langkawi